Mohamed Saber (born 4 September 1987) is a Moroccan tennis player.

Saber has a career high ATP singles ranking of 1020 achieved on 17 September 2007. He also has a career high ATP doubles ranking of 409 achieved on 2 March 2009.

Saber made his ATP main draw debut at the 2008 Grand Prix Hassan II.

References

External links

1987 births
Living people
Moroccan male tennis players
Sportspeople from Casablanca
21st-century Moroccan people